Kunji Lal Meena (1936 – 7 January 2019) was an Indian politician. He was elected to the Lok Sabha from Sawai Madhopur in Rajasthan, as a member of the Bharatiya Janata Party. He was elected to Rajasthan Legislative Assembly four times.

References

External links
Official biographical sketch in Parliament of India website

1936 births
2019 deaths
India MPs 1991–1996
Lok Sabha members from Rajasthan
Bharatiya Janata Party politicians from Rajasthan
People from Sawai Madhopur district